Amy Hargreaves (born January 27, 1970) is an American actress who has worked in film, television, video games and theater. She had a recurring role on Homeland as Maggie Mathison. In 1994, she starred in Brainscan with Edward Furlong. In 2012, she made an appearance as Dr. Karen Folson in the 2nd-season episode "Leap of Faith" on the CBS show Blue Bloods. In 2017, she began portraying the role of Lainie Jensen, mother of protagonist Clay Jensen, in the Netflix series 13 Reasons Why.

Filmography

Film

Television

Video games

References

External links
 

1970 births
American film actresses
American television actresses
Living people
Place of birth missing (living people)
20th-century American actresses
21st-century American actresses